Vadim Vladimirovich Brovtsev (Brovtsête Vlâdimire fert Vâdim; , , Vadim Brovcevi; born 26 July 1969) is a Russian businessman who was Prime Minister of the Republic of South Ossetia from 5 August 2009 to 26 April 2012, as well as Acting President from December 11, 2011 to April 19, 2012.

Brovtsev had served in the Soviet Strategic Rocket Forces. From 2005 until his appointment to a political post, Brovtsev was head of the board of directors of Russian construction company Vermikulit based in the city of Chelyabinsk.

Political life
Of Russian ethnicity, he was born in Chelyabinsk-65 (now Ozyorsk) in 1969.
Despite having no previous connection to South Ossetia, Brovtsev became Prime Minister of S.Ossetia after his predecessor, Aslanbek Bulatsev, was fired, according to the official decree, on health reasons, on 4 August 2009. 24 out of 27 MPs voted in favour of Brovtsev as the new PM. There were no other candidates.

In April 2010, Brovtsev came under heavy criticism from various sides. It was claimed that he did not manage Russia's monetary aid to rebuild destroyed South Ossetian buildings very well. 

Several members of the South Ossetian parliament called for Brovtsev to resign, and brought a motion of no confidence to the parliamentary debating floor, which was discussed on 5 May. On 5 May, president Eduard Kokoity appeared before parliament, reiterating his support for Brovtsev. 

Parliament still passed a motion, creating a commission to review the government's activities. The commission is to be led by deputy chairman of parliament and former Prime Minister Zurab Kokoyev, and among its other members is also former Prime Minister Merab Chigoev.

Meanwhile, Brovtsev has hit back by pointing at recent polls taken by the International Center of Political Analysis (MTsPA), which show an approval rating for Kokoity of 12.4%, with 66.3% of respondents having a negative opinion. Brovtsev, on the other hand is credited 37.8% positive and 10.9% negative. Kokoity's advisor Kosta Dzugaev called the poll "lies", stating that the MTsPA had never done any actual research in South Ossetia. 

The MTsPA has been linked to the website rsoinform.com, a news agency reporting favorably about Brovtsev, which at first sight appears to be an official government information service. South Ossetian government press agency OSinform states, however, that it is not official and not registered in South Ossetia. It is speculated that Brovtsev himself is linked to these institutions.

In an effort to defend himself against media attacks, Brovtsev has sued several media. Apparently the lawsuit at first included OSInform, leading to a somewhat embarrassing situation for Brovtsev, who did not know OSInform is the South Ossetian state information agency.

Personal life
Brovtsev is married and has two children.

Cabinet

Source:

References

|-

1969 births
Living people
People from Ozyorsk, Chelyabinsk Oblast
Presidents of South Ossetia
Prime Ministers of South Ossetia
Russian construction businesspeople